Guerra de Estados Pesados (Heavy State War) is the title of a compilation album, which compiles music from performers from six different states of Mexico: Sinaloa, Sonora, Nayarit, Zacatecas, Nuevo León and Durango. This album peaked at number-one in the Billboard Top Latin Albums chart for one week and dropped to number 16 the following week.

Track listing
The track listing from Amazon.com and Billboard.com
100% Cabrón (Sinaloa) - 2:32
Los Herederos Del Norte
Regalo Caro (Sonora) - 3:33
Chuy Vega
El Imagen (Zacatecas and Nayarit) - 2:22
El Jilguero Y El Original
Reten De La Sierra (Nayarit) - 3:34
El Original
Cargamento del Chivero (Nayarit) - 3:01
El Original
La Fuga Del Moreno (Sinaloa) - 3:08
El Marquez De Sinaloa
El Elotero (Durango) - 4:12
Los Gatilleros De Durango
Clave 7 (Sonora) - 3:23
Chuy Vega
Sinaloense De Corazon (Sinaloa) - 2:23
Los Herederos Del Norte
Reina de Reinas (Durango) - 3:04
Los Gatilleros De Durango
Mil Kilos (Nuevo León) - 3:33
Los Comandantes De Nuevo León
La Bella Juanita (Sonora) - 4:11
Chuy Vega
454 (Sinaloa) - 2:38
Los Herederos Del Norte
El Yoyo (Nuevo León) - 2:59
Los Comandantes De Nuevo León

Chart performance

Sales and certifications

References

2000 compilation albums
Norteño compilation albums
Spanish-language compilation albums